William Smith (born December 11, 1935) is a Canadian businessman, former politician, and former professional football player. Smith was a mayor of Edmonton, Alberta from 1995 until 2004. Smith was a Grey Cup champion with the Edmonton Eskimos.

Smith was born in 1935 in Edmonton, Alberta. Smith played for the Eskimos from 1956 to 1963 as a defensive back. Smith was named a West All-Star in 1960.

Smith was first elected in 1995 after defeating incumbent Mayor Jan Reimer and was re-elected in 1998 and 2001. As Mayor, Smith was known as "Booster Bill" for his efforts in promoting Edmonton as the "Greatest City in the Greatest Province in the Greatest Country." During his term in office, Smith is credited with being instrumental in bringing the IAAF World Championships in Athletics, the Juno Awards and the World Masters Games to Edmonton. Smith was defeated by Councillor Stephen Mandel in the 2004 Edmonton municipal election.

After his mayoralty ended, Smith became a director of BioNeutra, a producer of VitaFiber, a natural fiber-based food sweetener. Smith is also a director of Imperial Equities.

Notes 

1935 births
Living people
Businesspeople from Edmonton
Canadian sportsperson-politicians
Edmonton Elks players
Mayors of Edmonton
Canadian football people from Edmonton
20th-century Canadian politicians
21st-century Canadian politicians